"Chmýří pampelišek" is a song by the Czech pop music group Slza. It was released as a music video on 29 April 2018, but originally appeared on their second album Holomráz (released 3 November 2017). The music was composed by Lukáš Bundil and Dalibor Cidlinský Jr. and the lyrics were written by Xindl X.

Music video 
A music video was also shot on this song. The video clip includes footage from the Holomráz Tour 2018 (indoor tour). The video was shot and edited by Leoš Brabec from PrimeTime.

References 

2017 songs
2018 singles
Slza songs
Songs written by Xindl X